Tianjin Seagull Watch Group is a watchmaking company located in Tianjin, China. Founded in 1955, it is the world's largest manufacturer of mechanical watch movements, producing one quarter of total global production by volume.

History
The company was originally formed as Tianjin Watch Factory in January 1955 with four craftsmen on order of the People's Republic of China government. In 1990, the Tianjin Watch Factory was awarded the status of a national company, and in 1992, the Tianjin Seagull Corporation was founded. That same year, the decision was made to discontinue the production of mechanical watches in favour of quartz watches; five years later it came to a complete reversal of this decision. It has since produced exclusively mechanical movements and watches.

In 2000, Tianjin Seagull Watch Group went public, and in 2003 a representative office in Hong Kong was opened. In 2010, the company moved to new production and administration facilities near Tianjin Airport.

Tianjin Seagull has recently gained substantial expertise in the manufacture of advanced tourbillons including a multi-axial orbital tourbillon movement.

Brands
The following brand names were used for watches produced by Tianjin Seagull.

Movements

Movements used at both SeagullHK and tjSeagull. TY code used at SeagullHK. ST code used at tjSeagull.

 TY6XXX = ST6 (mechanical/auto, ladies sized movement) 
 TY2130 = ST21 (auto, 2130/ETA 2824) (incorrectly referred to as ST24) 
 TY25XX = ST25 (auto, regular & open heart)
 TY2661 = ST18 (auto, 1812/ETA 2892) (incorrectly referred to as ST26)
 TY27XX = ST17 (mechanical/auto, non-hacking, upgrade of ST16) 
 TY28XX = ST16 (mechanical/auto, many variants including skeleton) 
 TY29XX = ST19 (mechanical/auto chronograph)
 TY3100 = ST31 (mechanical, 3 dials inline w/ open heart) 
 TY36XX = ST36 (mechanical, Unitas 6497/98) 
 TY80XX = ST80 (mechanical/auto, carousel tourbillon, carousel skeleton tourbillon)
 TY82XX = ST82 (mechanical/auto, flying/bridged tourbillon)
 TY8080 = ST80 (mechanical, dual carousel tourbillon)
 TY84XX = ST84 (mechanical carousel tourbillon, ladies)
 TY9000 = ST90 (mechanical quarter repeater)
 TY9100 = ST91 (mechanical minute repeater)

Movements unique to tjSeagull/USSeagull website

 2100 = ST21 (auto, 2100/ETA 2836)
 2241 = ST22 (pair of auto ST6 on same plate) 
 2590 = ST2590 (auto, perpetual calendar with moonphase)
 2800 = ST28 (mechanical alarm)
 9000 = ST90 (mechanical, repeater)

Gallery

See also 
 Chinese standard movement

References

External links
 (Chinese)
 Sea-Gull Watch Collection (Chinese)
 European Sales Website
 Seagull 1963 European Sales Website
 US Sales Website
 Canada Sales Website

Watch manufacturing companies of China
Watch movement manufacturers
Watch brands
Manufacturing companies based in Tianjin
Manufacturing companies established in 1955
1955 establishments in China
Chinese brands